Prince Jean (French:Le prince Jean) is a 1928 French silent film directed by René Hervil and starring Renée Héribel, Lucien Dalsace and Paul Guidé. It is based on a play of the same title by Charles Méré.

Cast
 Renée Héribel as Claire d'Arlon  
 Lucien Dalsace as Le prince Jean d'Axel  
 Paul Guidé as Robert d'Arnheim  
 Simone Montalet as Mme de Grivelles  
 André Dubosc as Le comte de Wavre  
 Nino Constantini as Léopold d'Axel  
 Georges Deneubourg as Le prince d'Axel  
 Léonce Cargue as de Leyde  
 Hubert Daix as Harlingen  
 Pierre Saint-Bonnet

References

Bibliography
 Goble, Alan. The Complete Index to Literary Sources in Film. Walter de Gruyter, 1999.

External links

1928 films
Films directed by René Hervil
French silent feature films
French films based on plays
Pathé films
French black-and-white films
1920s French films